Raymond Mulinghausen (3 September 1920 – 19 February 2009) was a French diver. He competed at the 1948 Summer Olympics and the 1952 Summer Olympics.

References

1920 births
2009 deaths
French male divers
Olympic divers of France
Divers at the 1948 Summer Olympics
Divers at the 1952 Summer Olympics
Divers from Paris
20th-century French people